Panther Branch School, also known as Juniper Level School, is a historic Rosenwald School building located near Raleigh, Wake County, North Carolina.  It was built in 1926, and is a one-story, frame, weatherboarded building with Colonial Revival style design elements. It sits on a brick pier foundation infilled with concrete block.  The school closed in 1952.  It is owned by the Juniper Level Baptist Church, who uses the building as a meeting place and social hall.

It was listed on the National Register of Historic Places in 2001.

References

Rosenwald schools in North Carolina
School buildings on the National Register of Historic Places in North Carolina
Colonial Revival architecture in North Carolina
School buildings completed in 1926
Schools in Wake County, North Carolina
National Register of Historic Places in Wake County, North Carolina
1926 establishments in North Carolina